Abilene USD 435 is a public unified school district headquartered in Abilene, Kansas, United States.  The district includes the communities of Abilene, Talmage, and nearby rural areas.

Schools
The school district operates the following schools:
 Abilene High School
 Abilene Middle School
 Eisenhower School
 McKinley School
 Kennedy School

In the fall pupils in high schools may pick cross-country, tennis, volleyball and football as sports activities, in winter basketball and wrestling, in spring they may choose tennis, baseball, softball, golf and track.

In middle schools, football, cross-country and volleyball is available year-round.

See also
 Kansas State Department of Education
 Kansas State High School Activities Association
 List of high schools in Kansas
 List of unified school districts in Kansas

References

External links
 

School districts in Kansas
Education in Dickinson County, Kansas